Skyshield air-defence system is a modular, light weight,  short range air defense (SHORAD) system developed by the Swiss corporation Oerlikon Contraves (now a subsidiary of Rheinmetall of Germany).  The successor to the Skyguard defense system, Skyshield is intended to rapidly acquire and destroy threatening aircraft and missiles, as well as to fulfill a C-RAM role.

Design 

The weapons system itself consists of two 35 mm (1.38 inch) revolver cannons with a rate of fire of 1,000 rounds per minute, a fire control system made up of a sensor unit and a detached command post. The Skyshield can use up to two surface-to-air missile 8-cell modules for an expanded air defense capability. The Skyshield is designed for traditional anti-aircraft roles in addition to defense against missiles (see anti-ballistic missile).

The Skyshield is easily deployed by trucks and other transportation systems. 

The fire control system (FCS) uses an X-band search and tracking radar X-TAR-3D, and another unit for radar/TV and/or laser/FLIR precision tracking. The command post can be placed up to 500 meters, roughly, from the fire control unit (FCU), using encrypted radio-waves. The Skyshield system can be networked with other air defense systems for wider and more effective air coverage, expanding its roles from point defense to area defense.

Radars for the acquisition and tracking of air and surface targets, named Oerlikon Tracking Module TMX Mk2 and TMKu Mk2, operated in X and Ku band respectively.

Variants 
A modified and improved version of Skyshield with six fully automated turrets, dubbed MANTIS (Modular, Automatic and Network capable Targeting and Interception System) was ordered by the German Army as a stationary base defence system. Two systems were delivered in 2011, with more orders being planned as a part of German Army's future "SysFla" air defence program.

A mobile version called Oerlikon Skyranger 35 has been demonstrated with the turret fitted to a Boxer armoured fighting vehicle.

Adoption
In March 2014, Rheinmetall signed a contract with South Africa to modernize the country's existing SHORAD systems. The contract encompassed the supply of Oerlikon Skyshield fire control units to substantially improve the performance and accuracy of South Africa’s existing twin-gun systems, as well as significantly expand the operational spectrum of its air defence capabilities. 

South Africa currently operates 102 GDF-002 and 48 modified GDF-005 units. In this context, a number of the twin-gun systems will also be retrofitted with upgrade kits to accommodate Rheinmetall’s state-of-the-art AHEAD anti-missile programmable ammunition including logistics and training services. The complete package was scheduled for completion by 2017.

Indonesia operated four units of the Skyshield in 2017, and signed a second contract for additional eleven more units in 2017 but effective only in November 2018 due to funding issues.

In October 2022, the Qatar Emiri Air Defence Forces revealed they had procured the Skynex, a modular air defense architecture centered around the Skymaster battle management system that can link components of the Skyshield. Rheinmetall is believed to have received a contract in October 2019 worth around €210 million (US$204 million) for an unspecified number of Skymasters, radars, and guns including AHEAD programmable air-bursting ammunition that is effective against small targets out to a range of 4 km. Video released by the Qatari Ministry of Defence showed eight 35 mm Revolver Gun Mk3s and one X-TAR3D target acquisition and tracking radar.

On 9 December 2022, a German government spokesman said that Rheinmetall would provide two Skynex systems to Ukraine at the beginning of 2024 as part of assistance during the 2022 Russian invasion of Ukraine. Valued at approximately €182 million ($192 million), Germany would pay for the cost involved. The Skynex air defense system is based on a concept that keeps airspace surveillance separate from the effectors, only requiring a tracking unit to link a C2 network with different weapons. Each Skynex system comprises four Revolver Gun Mk3 cannons, a CN-1 control node, and an X-TAR3D radar all mounted on HX trucks.

See also 
 List of artillery
 Anti-aircraft guns
 MANTIS - the very short-range protection system of the German Army within the "SysFla" program.
 Phalanx CIWS - A land-based stand alone model of the Phalanx Weapon System called the Centurion CRAM were deployed to the Middle East by the United States in 2008.

References

External links
The Oerlikon website

35 mm artillery
Anti-aircraft guns of Germany
Artillery of Switzerland
Oerlikon-Contraves
Missile defense